Justin Hicks (born October 28, 1974) is an American professional golfer.

Hicks was born in Wyandotte, Michigan. He graduated from the University of Michigan and currently plays on the Web.com Tour.

After one day at the 2008 U.S. Open, Hicks was tied for the lead after shooting a 68. He fell well down the leaderboard after the first round and ended in a tie for 74th.

Hicks finished 25th on the 2010 Nationwide Tour money list, the last automatic qualifying spot. As a PGA Tour rookie in 2011, Hicks finished in 60th place in the 2011 U.S. Open.

Hicks finished 11th on the 2012 Nationwide Tour money list, earning an automatic qualifying spot on the PGA Tour for the 2013 season. In his first event of 2013, Hicks finished T13 at the Sony Open in Hawaii.

Professional wins (2)

Nationwide Tour wins (2)

Nationwide Tour playoff record (1–0)

Results in major championships

CUT = missed the half-way cut
"T" = tied

See also
2010 Nationwide Tour graduates
2010 PGA Tour Qualifying School graduates
2012 Web.com Tour graduates

External links

American male golfers
Michigan Wolverines men's golfers
PGA Tour golfers
Korn Ferry Tour graduates
Golfers from Michigan
Golfers from Florida
People from Wyandotte, Michigan
People from Palm Beach County, Florida
1974 births
Living people